The Vermont Maple Festival is a food and arts celebration held at St. Albans in the U.S. state of Vermont. 

The festival is a three-day event held annually over the last weekend in April. During the event, there are exhibits and demonstrations, entertainment, and a craft show all dedicated to maple syrup. It takes place to celebrate the first harvest of the year in Vermont. A pancake breakfast is also held, a parade, antiques show, and the crowning of the festivals' Maple King and Maple Queen.

See also
Vermont Maple Foundation
Vermont Maple Sugar Makers' Association

References

External links

St. Albans, Vermont
Vermont cuisine
Agriculture in Vermont
Vermont culture
Tourist attractions in Franklin County, Vermont
April events